Schitu or Schit may refer to several places in Romania:

 Schitu, Giurgiu, a commune in Giurgiu County
 Schitu, Olt, a commune in Olt County
 Schitu Duca, a commune in Iași County
 Schitu Golești, a commune in Argeș County
 Schitu, a village in Costinești Commune, Constanța County
 Schitu, a village in Braloștița Commune, Dolj County
 Schitu, a village in Bogdănița Commune, Vaslui County
 Schitu, a village in Nicolae Bălcescu Commune, Vâlcea County
 Schitu Deleni, a village in Teslui Commune, Olt County
 Schitu din Deal and Schitu din Vale, villages in Pleșoiu Commune, Olt County
 Schitu Frumoasa, a village in Balcani Commune, Bacău County
 Schitu Hadâmbului, a village in Mironeasa Commune, Iași County
 Schitu-Matei, a village in Ciofrângeni Commune, Argeș County
 Schitu Poienari, a village in Vitănești Commune, Teleorman County
 Schitu Scoiceşti, a village in Leordeni Commune, Argeș County
 Schitu Stavnic, a village in Voinești Commune, Iași County
 Schitu Tarcău, a village in Tarcău Commune, Neamț County
 Schitu Topolniţei, a village in Izvoru Bârzii Commune, Mehedinți County
 Schit-Orăşeni, a village in Cristești Commune, Botoșani County
 Schit (Bistrița), a tributary of the river Bistrița in Neamț County
 Schit (Tazlău), a tributary of the river Tazlău in Bacău County